Edith Dorothy Holman (18 July 1883 – 15 June 1968) was a British tennis player and three time ILTF world champion twice in singles winning the World Covered Court Championships in 1919, and the World Hard Court Championships in 1920 and once in doubles the same year. In addition she was a double silver medalist at the 1920 Summer Olympics (singles and doubles).

Career
Holman was born in Kilburn, London. In 1920 she won the silver medal in the singles event as well as in the doubles competition with her partner Geraldine Beamish. She also competed in the mixed doubles event with Gordon Lowe but they were eliminated in the first round. In 1919 she won the singles title at the World Covered Court Championship, played on wooden courts at the Sporting Club de Paris, defeating Germaine Regnier Golding in the final in straight sets. She also won the World Hard Court Championship in 1920 defeating Francisca Subirana in straight sets.

Her best result at the Wimbledon Championships came in 1912 and 1913 when she reached the semifinal of the singles event, which she lost to Charlotte Copper Sterry and Winifred Slocock McNair respectively.

Her other career singles highlights include winning the British Covered Court Championships, played at the Queen's Club in London, on four occasions (1912, 1914, 1921 and 1922), and the Drive Club Tournament at Fulham on hard cement four times (1912, 1920, 1922-1923).

World Championships finals

Singles (2 titles)

References

External links
 
 Dorothy Holman's profile at databaseOlympics
 

1883 births
1968 deaths
English female tennis players
French Championships (tennis) champions
Olympic silver medallists for Great Britain
Olympic tennis players of Great Britain
People from Kilburn, London
Tennis players at the 1920 Summer Olympics
Olympic medalists in tennis
Medalists at the 1920 Summer Olympics
Tennis people from Greater London